The St John's Wood Clique was a group of Victorian artists who mostly lived in the St John's Wood area of London. Their ideas were broadly similar to an earlier group also called The Clique. The principal members of the group were Philip Hermogenes Calderon, George Dunlop Leslie, Henry Stacy Marks, George Adolphus Storey, David Wilkie Wynfield, John Evan Hodgson and William Frederick Yeames. According to Graham Reynolds the group was notable for its love of practical jokes. 

Wynfield took photographs of all the members in fancy dress, along with other notable associates such as John Everett Millais and Manet. Most of the members also belonged to the Artists Rifles.

Notes

19th-century art groups
British art
St John's Wood
19th century in London
Victorian era